Staurogyne hirsuta is a species of plant native to Brazilian cerrado vegetation. This plant is cited in Flora Brasiliensis by Carl Friedrich Philipp von Martius.

hirsuta
Flora of Brazil
Plants described in 1891